Stonewall was an unincorporated community in Raleigh County, West Virginia, United States.

References 

Ghost towns in West Virginia
Geography of Raleigh County, West Virginia